Wairau may refer to:

Wairau (New Zealand electorate), parliamentary electorate in the Marlborough Region of New Zealand
Wairau Bar, a gravel bar formed where the Wairau River meets the sea in Cloudy Bay, Marlborough, New Zealand
Wairau Fault, an active fault in the northeastern part of South Island, New Zealand
Wairau River, Marlborough, New Zealand
Wairau Valley, Marlborough, New Zealand
Wairau Valley, Auckland, New Zealand
Wairau Affray, an 1843 conflict in the New Zealand Land Wars